Kālidāsa (fl. 4th–5th century CE) was a Classical Sanskrit author who is often considered ancient India's greatest poet and playwright. His plays and poetry are primarily based on the Vedas, the Rāmāyaṇa, the Mahābhārata and the Purāṇas.  His surviving works consist of three plays, two epic poems and two shorter poems.

Much about his life is unknown except what can be inferred from his poetry and plays. His works cannot be dated with precision, but they were most likely authored before the 5th century CE.

Early life
Scholars have speculated that Kālidāsa may have lived near the Himalayas, in the vicinity of Ujjain, and in Kalinga. This hypothesis is based on Kālidāsa's detailed description of the Himalayas in his Kumārasambhava, the display of his love for Ujjain in Meghadūta, and his highly eulogistic descriptions of Kalingan emperor Hemāngada in Raghuvaṃśa (sixth sarga).

Lakshmi Dhar Kalla (1891–1953), a Sanskrit scholar and a Kashmiri Pandit, wrote a book titled The birth-place of Kalidasa (1926), which tries to trace the birthplace of Kālidāsa based on his writings. He concluded that Kālidāsa was born in Kashmir, but moved southwards, and sought the patronage of local rulers to prosper. The evidence cited by him from Kālidāsa's writings includes:

 Description of flora and fauna that is found in Kashmir, but not in Ujjain or Kalinga: the saffron plant, the deodar trees, musk deer etc.
 Description of geographical features common to Kashmir, such as tarns and glades
 Mention of some sites of minor importance that, according to Kalla, can be identified with places in Kashmir. These sites are not very famous outside Kashmir, and therefore, could not have been known to someone not in close touch with Kashmir.
 Reference to certain legends of Kashmiri origin, such as that of the Nikumbha (mentioned in the Kashmiri text Nīlamata Purāṇa); mention (in Shakuntala) of the legend about Kashmir being created from a lake. This legend, mentioned in Nīlamata Purāṇa, states that a tribal leader named Ananta drained a lake to kill a demon. Ananta named the site of the former lake (now land) as "Kashmir", after his father Kaśyapa.
 According to Kalla, Śakuntalā is an allegorical dramatization of Pratyabhijna philosophy (a branch of Kashmir Shaivism). Kalla further argues that this branch was not known outside of Kashmir at that time.

Another old legend recounts that Kālidāsa visits Kumāradāsa, the king of Lanka and, because of treachery, is murdered there.

Period 
Several ancient and medieval books state that Kālidāsa was a court poet of a king named Vikramāditya. A legendary king named Vikramāditya is said to have ruled from Ujjain around the 1st century BCE. A section of scholars believe that this legendary Vikramāditya is not a historical figure at all. There are other kings who ruled from Ujjain and adopted the title Vikramāditya, the most notable ones being Chandragupta II (r. 380 CE – 415 CE) and Yaśodharman (6th century CE).

The most popular theory is that Kālidāsa flourished during the reign of Chandragupta II, and therefore lived around the 4th-5th century CE. Several Western scholars have supported this theory, since the days of William Jones and A. B. Keith. Modern western Indologists and scholars like Stanley Wolpert also support this theory. Many Indian scholars, such as Vasudev Vishnu Mirashi and Ram Gupta, also place Kālidāsa in this period. According to this theory, his career might have extended to the reign of Kumāragupta I (r. 414 – 455 CE), and possibly, to that of Skandagupta (r. 455 – 467 CE).

The earliest paleographical evidence of Kālidāsa is found in a Sanskrit inscription dated c. 473 CE, found at Mandsaur's Sun temple, with some verses that appear to imitate Meghadūta Purva, 66;  and the ṛtusaṃhāra V, 2–3, although Kālidāsa is not named. His name, along with that of the poet Bhāravi, is first mentioned the 634 CE Aihole inscription found in Karnataka.

Theory of multiple Kālidāsas 

Some scholars, including M. Srinivasachariar and T. S. Narayana Sastri, believe that works attributed to "Kālidāsa" are not by a single person. According to Srinivasachariar, writers from 8th and 9th centuries hint at the existence of three noted literary figures who share the name Kālidāsa. These writers include Devendra (author of Kavi-Kalpa-Latā), Rājaśekhara and Abhinanda. Sastri lists the works of these three Kalidasas as follows:

 Kālidāsa alias Mātṛgupta, author of Setu-Bandha and three plays (Abhijñānaśākuntalam, Mālavikāgnimitram and Vikramōrvaśīyam).
 Kālidāsa alias Medharudra, author of Kumārasambhava, Meghadūta and Raghuvaṃśa.
 Kālidāsa alias Kotijit: author of Ṛtusaṃhāra, Śyāmala-Daṇḍakam and Śṛngāratilaka among other works.

Sastri goes on to mention six other literary figures known by the name "Kālidāsa": Parimala Kālidāsa alias Padmagupta (author of Navasāhasāṅka Carita), Kālidāsa alias Yamakakavi (author of Nalodaya), Nava Kālidāsa (author of Champu Bhāgavata), Akbariya Kalidasa (author of several samasyas or riddles), Kālidāsa VIII (author of Lambodara Prahasana), and Abhinava Kālidāsa alias Mādhava (author of Saṅkṣepa-Śaṅkara-Vijayam).

According to K. Krishnamoorthy, "Vikramāditya" and "Kālidāsa" were used as common nouns to describe any patron king and any court poet, respectively.

Works

Poems

Epic poems
Kālidāsa is the author of two mahākāvyas, Kumārasambhava (Kumāra meaning Kartikeya, and sambhava meaning possibility of an event taking place, in this context a birth. Kumārasambhava thus means the birth of a Kartikeya) and Raghuvaṃśa ("Dynasty of Raghu").

Kumārasambhava describes the birth and adolescence of the goddess Pārvatī, her marriage to Śiva and the subsequent birth of their son Kumāra (Kārtikeya).
Raghuvaṃśa is an epic poem about the kings of the Raghu dynasty.

Minor poems
Kālidāsa also wrote the Meghadūta (The Cloud Messenger), a khaṇḍakāvya (minor poem). It describes the story of a Yakṣa trying to send a message to his lover through a cloud. Kālidāsa set this poem to the mandākrāntā meter, which is known for its lyrical sweetness. It is one of Kālidāsa's most popular poems and numerous commentaries on the work have been written.

Kalidasa also wrote the shyamala Dandakam  descripting the beauty of Goddess Matangi.

Plays
Kālidāsa wrote three plays. Among them, Abhijñānaśākuntalam ("Of the recognition of Śakuntalā") is generally regarded as a masterpiece. It was among the first Sanskrit works to be translated into English, and has since been translated into many languages.

Mālavikāgnimitram (Pertaining to Mālavikā and Agnimitra) tells the story of King Agnimitra, who falls in love with the picture of an exiled servant girl named Mālavikā. When the queen discovers her husband's passion for this girl, she becomes infuriated and has Mālavikā imprisoned, but as fate would have it, Mālavikā is in fact a true-born princess, thus legitimizing the affair.
Abhijñānaśākuntalam (Of the recognition of Śakuntalā) tells the story of King Duṣyanta who, while on a hunting trip, meets Śakuntalā, the adopted daughter of the sage Kanu and real daughter of Vishwamitra and Menaka and marries her. A mishap befalls them when he is summoned back to court: Śakuntala, pregnant with their child, inadvertently offends a visiting Durvasa and incurs a curse, whereby Duṣyanta forgets her entirely until he sees the ring he has left with her. On her trip to Duṣyanta's court in an advanced state of pregnancy, she loses the ring, and has to come away unrecognized by him. The ring is found by a fisherman who recognizes the royal seal and returns it to Duṣyanta, who regains his memory of Śakuntala and sets out to find her. Goethe was fascinated by Kālidāsa's Abhijñānaśākuntalam, which became known in Europe, after being translated from English to German.
Vikramōrvaśīyam (Ūrvaśī Won by Valour) tells the story of King Pururavas and celestial nymph Ūrvaśī who fall in love. As an immortal, she has to return to the heavens, where an unfortunate accident causes her to be sent back to the earth as a mortal with the curse that she will die (and thus return to heaven) the moment her lover lays his eyes on the child which she will bear him. After a series of mishaps, including Ūrvaśī's temporary transformation into a vine, the curse is lifted, and the lovers are allowed to remain together on the earth.

Translations

Montgomery Schuyler, Jr. published a bibliography of the editions and translations of the drama Śakuntalā while preparing his work "Bibliography of the Sanskrit Drama". Schuyler later completed his bibliography series of the dramatic works of Kālidāsa by compiling bibliographies of the editions and translations of Vikramōrvaśīyam and Mālavikāgnimitra. Sir William Jones published an English translation of Śakuntalā in 1791 CE and Ṛtusaṃhāra was published by him in original text during 1792 CE.

False attributions and false Kalidasas 
According to Indologist Siegfried Lienhard:A large number of long and short poems have incorrectly been attributed to Kalidasa, for instance the Bhramarastaka, the Ghatakarpara, the Mangalastaka, the Nalodaya (a work by Ravideva), the Puspabanavilasa, which is sometimes also ascribed to Vararuci or Ravideva, the Raksasakavya, the Rtusamhara, the Sarasvatistotra, the Srngararasastaka, the Srngaratilaka, the Syamaladandaka and the short, didactic text on prosody, the Srutabodha, otherwise thought to be by Vararuci or the Jaina Ajitasena. In addition to the non-authentic works, there are also some "false" Kalidasas. Immensely proud of their poetic achievement, several later poets have either been barefaced enough to call themselves Kalidasa or have invented pseudonyms such as Nava-Kalidasa, "New Kalidasa", Akbariya-Kalidasa, "Akbar-Kalidasa", etc.

Influence
Kālidāsa has had a great influence on several Sanskrit works, on all Indian literature. He also had a great impact on Rabindranath Tagore. Meghadūta's romanticism is found in Tagore's poems on the monsoons. Sanskrit plays by Kālidāsa influenced late eighteenth and early nineteenth-century European literature. According to Dale Carnegie, Father of Modern Medicine Sir William Osler always kept on his desk a poem written by Kalidasa.

Critical reputation 
Bāṇabhaṭṭa, the 7th-century CE Sanskrit prose-writer and poet, has written: nirgatāsu na vā kasya kālidāsasya sūktiṣu, prītirmadhurasārdrāsu mañjarīṣviva jāyate. ("When Kālidāsa's sweet sayings, charming with sweet sentiment, went forth, who did not feel delight in them as in honey-laden flowers?").

Jayadeva, a later poet, has called Kālidāsa a kavikulaguru, 'the lord of poets' and the vilāsa, 'graceful play' of the muse of poetry.

Kālidāsa has been called the Shakespeare of India. The scholar and philologist Sir William Jones is said to be the first to do so. Writing about this, author and scholar MR Kale says "the very comparison of Kālidāsa to Shakespeare is the highest form of eulogy that could be bestowed upon him."

The Indologist Sir Monier Williams has written: "No composition of Kālidāsa displays more the richness of his poetical genius, the exuberance of his imagination, the warmth and play of his fancy, his profound knowledge of the human heart, his delicate appreciation of its most refined and tender emotions, his familiarity with the workings and counterworkings of its conflicting feelings - in short more entitles him to rank as the Shakespeare of India."

Philosopher and linguist Humboldt writes, "Kālidāsa, the celebrated author of the Śākuntalā, is a masterly describer of the influence which Nature exercises upon the minds of lovers. Tenderness in the expression of feelings and richness of creative fancy have assigned to him his lofty place among the poets of all nations."

Later culture
Many scholars have written commentaries on the works of Kālidāsa. Among the most studied commentaries are those by Kolāchala Mallinātha Suri, which were written in the 15th century during the reign of the Vijayanagara king, Deva Rāya II. The earliest surviving commentaries appear to be those of the 10th-century Kashmirian scholar Vallabhadeva. Eminent Sanskrit poets like Bāṇabhaṭṭa, Jayadeva and Rajasekhara have lavished praise on Kālidāsa in their tributes. A well-known Sanskrit verse ("Upamā Kālidāsasya...") praises his skill at upamā, or similes. Anandavardhana, a highly revered critic, considered Kālidāsa to be one of the greatest Sanskrit poets ever. Of the hundreds of pre-modern Sanskrit commentaries on Kālidāsa's works, only a fraction have been contemporarily published. Such commentaries show signs of Kālidāsa's poetry being changed from its original state through centuries of manual copying, and possibly through competing oral traditions which ran alongside the written tradition.

Kālidāsa's Abhijñānaśākuntalam was one of the first works of Indian literature to become known in Europe. It was first translated into English and then from English into German, where it was received with wonder and fascination by a group of eminent poets, which included Herder and Goethe.

Kālidāsa's work continued to evoke inspiration among the artistic circles of Europe during the late 19th century and early 20th century, as evidenced by Camille Claudel's sculpture Shakuntala.

Koodiyattam artist and Nāṭya Śāstra scholar Māni Mādhava Chākyār (1899–1990) of Kerala choreographed and performed popular Kālidāsa plays including Abhijñānaśākuntala, Vikramorvaśīya and Mālavikāgnimitra.

The Kannada films Mahakavi Kalidasa (1955), featuring Honnappa Bagavatar, B. Sarojadevi and later Kaviratna Kalidasa (1983), featuring Rajkumar and Jaya Prada, were based on the life of Kālidāsa. Kaviratna Kalidasa also used Kālidāsa's Shakuntala as a sub-plot in the movie.V. Shantaram made the Hindi movie Stree (1961) based on Kālidāsa's Shakuntala. R.R. Chandran made the Tamil movie Mahakavi Kalidas (1966) based on Kālidāsa's life. Chevalier Nadigar Thilagam Sivaji Ganesan played the part of the poet himself. Mahakavi Kalidasu (Telugu, 1960) featuring Akkineni Nageswara Rao was similarly based on Kālidāsa's life and work.

Surendra Verma's Hindi play Athavan Sarga, published in 1976, is based on the legend that Kālidāsa could not complete his epic Kumārasambhava because he was cursed by the goddess Pārvatī, for obscene descriptions of her conjugal life with Śiva in the eighth canto. The play depicts Kālidāsa as a court poet of Chandragupta who faces a trial on the insistence of a priest and some other moralists of his time.

Asti Kashchid Vagarthiyam is a five-act Sanskrit play written by Krishna Kumar in 1984. The story is a variation of the popular legend that Kālidāsa was mentally challenged at one time and that his wife was responsible for his transformation. Kālidāsa, a mentally challenged shepherd, is married to Vidyottamā, a learned princess, through a conspiracy. On discovering that she has been tricked, Vidyottamā banishes Kālidāsa, asking him to acquire scholarship and fame if he desires to continue their relationship. She further stipulates that on his return he will have to answer the question, Asti Kaścid Vāgarthaḥ" ("Is there anything special in expression?"), to her satisfaction. In due course, Kālidāsa attains knowledge and fame as a poet. Kālidāsa begins Kumārsambhava, Raghuvaṃśa and Meghaduta with the words Asti ("there is"), Kaścit ("something") and Vāgarthaḥ ("spoken word and its meaning") respectively.

Bishnupada Bhattacharya's "Kalidas o Robindronath" is a comparative study of Kalidasa and the Bengali poet Rabindranath Tagore.

Ashadh Ka Ek Din is a Hindi play based on fictionalized elements of Kalidasa's life.

See also
 Sanskrit literature
 Sanskrit drama
 Bhāsa
 Bhavabhūti

References

Citation

Notes

Bibliography

Further reading

External links

 Kalidasa: Translations of Shakuntala and Other Works by Arthur W. Ryder
 Biography of Kalidasa
 
 
 
 Clay Sanskrit Library publishes classical Indian literature, including the works of Kalidasa with Sanskrit facing-page text and translation. Also offers searchable corpus and downloadable materials.
 Kalidasa at The Online Library of Liberty
 
 Epigraphical Echoes of Kalidasa

 
4th-century births
5th-century deaths
Indian male poets
Hindu poets
Epic poets
Sanskrit dramatists and playwrights
Sanskrit poets
5th-century Indian poets
Ancient Indian dramatists and playwrights
Indian male dramatists and playwrights
Indian Hindus
Ancient Indian poets
Ancient Hinduism
Ancient Indian grammarians
Artist authors
Indian male artists
People from Ujjain